Maków Mazowiecki  is a town in Poland, in the Masovian Voivodship. It is the powiat capital of Maków County (or Powiat of Maków). Its population is 10,850.

History

The town obtained its town charter in 1421. It was a Polish royal town, administratively located in the Masovian Voivodeship in the Greater Poland Province of the Polish Crown.

A battle was fought nearby on August 19, 1920, during the Polish-Soviet War.

Before 1939 about 7,000 people lived in Maków, including 4,000 Poles and 3,000 Jews. During the German invasion of Poland, which started World War II, the Einsatzgruppe V entered the town on September 10–11, 1939, commit atrocities against the population. The Einsatzgruppe V immediately carried out searches of Polish offices and organizations. Medicines from pharmacies and local supplies of grain, sugar and rice were confiscated for the German Army. Under German occupation the name was Germanized to Mackeim. In Maków, the Germans operated a concentration camp for ill and disabled people from the region. In February 1940, the Germans murdered 560 people from the camp in a forest near Wyszogród, while 50 people from the local hospital were murdered in the nearby village of Grzanka. The Jewish community was murdered by Nazi Germany in the Holocaust. Some killings were done in the town; thousands of Maków Mazowiecki Jews were murdered at the Auschwitz concentration camp. The Germans also operated a forced labour camp in the town from 1941 to 1944.

While a secret protocol had been struck prior to World War II between Nazi Germany and the Soviet Union that laid plans to split up Poland between them, Germany later abrogated this agreement and struck deeply into Russian territory. The Germans occupied Maków Mazowiecki from September 1939 to April 1945.  in January 1945, heavy fighting and artillery barrages destroyed 90% of the town's buildings.

Notable people
David Azrieli - Canadian businessman and philanthropist
Kamil Majkowski - Polish football player
Hyman G. Rickover - admiral in the US Navy, born in Maków in 1900. His leadership in the nuclear propulsion and power generation was instrumental in developing a culture where safety was paramount.
Leib Langfus - Rabbi from Makow, later murdered in Auschwitz-Birkenau. His diary of his deportation and time in Auschwitz-Birkenau are considered one of the most valuable Holocaust era eyewitness testimonies.

References

External links
Official town webpage
Location via Encarta Maps
 "Mapping the Holocaust" -- pictures Soviet and German officers dividing Poland
 Jewish Community in Maków Mazowiecki on Virtual Shtetl

Cities and towns in Masovian Voivodeship
Maków County
Masovian Voivodeship (1526–1795)
Łomża Governorate
Warsaw Voivodeship (1919–1939)
Holocaust locations in Poland